USCS Varina was a schooner that served as a survey ship in the United States Coast Survey, a predecessor of the United States Coast and Geodetic Survey, from 1854 to 1875. 

Varina was built in 1854 by Fardy Brothers at Baltimore, Maryland.  She entered Coast Survey service that year. 

On more than one occasion, Varina assisted mariners in distress. In December 1856, at the request of the American consul in Havana, Cuba, Varina called at Nassau on New Providence in the Bahama Islands to take on board the crew and steerage passengers of the American ship Julia Howard, which a short time earlier had wrecked on the Bahama Banks, leaving her crew and passengers destitute at New Providence. Varina transported Julia Howards crew to Havana, and then took her passengers and any crew who preferred it to Pensacola, Florida.

In February 1858, in response to a request for help by the consignees of the schooner Georgia, which had stranded a few days earlier about 30 nautical miles (56 kilometers) from Pensacola, Varina proceeded to the site of the wreck, but the combined efforts of the crews of Varina and Georgia failed to free Georgia.

On the night of 20 January 1858, Varina was at Pensacola, Florida, when a major fire broke out at the United States Armys Fort Pickens. Her hydrographic party, along with men and boats of the Coast Survey steamer USCS Robert J. Walker, promptly assisted in fighting the fire. The next day, Varinas commanding officer received a communication from Captain John Newton of the Army Corps of Engineers, commanding the harbor of Pensacola, acknowledging the important firefighting service rendered by Varina.

On the morning of 21 February 1860, the Russian bark Vesta ran aground on the north breaker at the Ossabaw entrance to the Savannah River off the coast of Georgia and was wrecked. Varina took Vestas officers and crew aboard and gave them shelter for the night, and Varinas crew was able to assist in ultimately saving Vestas cargo and stores for Vestas and the cargos owners. The Russian vice consul at Savannah acknowledged Varinas assistance to Vesta.

Varina was retired from Coast Survey service in 1875.

References
NOAA History, A Science Odyssey: Tools of the Trade: Ships: Coast and Geodetic Survey Ships: Varina
NOAA History, A Science Odyssey: Hall of Honor: In the Line of Duty 1846-1936
NOAA History, A Science Odyssey: Hall of Honor: Lifesaving and Protection of Property by the Coast & Geodetic Survey 1845-1937

Ships of the United States Coast Survey
Survey ships of the United States
Ships built in Baltimore
1854 ships